Ketsby is a hamlet in the civil parish of South Ormsby in the East Lindsey district of Lincolnshire, England. The population of the hamlet is included in the civil parish of Brinkhill.

An early medieval cresset lamp, with a maltese cross carved on the base, was found at Ketsby and is now in Lincoln City and County Museum.

Ketsby water mill and mill house are built in yellow brick, date from 1864, and are Grade II listed buildings. The mill is no longer in operation.

The Greenwich Prime Zero meridian line passes through the hamlet.

References

External links

Hamlets in Lincolnshire
East Lindsey District